Srinivasa Murty Srinivasula is an Indian cell biologist, a professor at the School of Biology at the Indian Institute of Science Education and Research, Thiruvananthapuram (IISER Thiruvananthapuram) in Kerala, India. His research field is apoptosis, autophagy and oncology.

Life and career 

Professor Murty received his B.Sc and M.Sc degrees from the Andhra University and his PhD from the Banaras Hindu University in Varanasi, India. He later moved to the Thomas Jefferson University as a research associate and became an instructor at the Sidney Kimmel Cancer Center at Thomas Jefferson University in Philadelphia, United States. During 2003–2012, he was the principal investigator at National Cancer Institute, NIH, Bethesda. He was Professor-in-charge (administration) at the IISER Thiruvananthapuram, as well as the member of the IISER TVM Senate. He also served on several institute committees. Currently he is Deputy Director of the institute.

Key awards and distinctions 
Professor Murty has received the following awards:

 Kimmel Scholar (2003-2005), The Sidney Kimmel Foundation for Cancer Research, Baltimore, MD
 Special Fellow (2000-2003), The Leukemia and Lymphoma Society, New York, NY
 Young Scientist Travel Award, American Association for Cancer Research, Inc. Philadelphia
 Research Fellowships (1987-1992), University Grants Commission (India)
 National Merit Scholarships (1984 -1986), Department of Education, Government of India, New Delhi

Publications 
Professor Murty has published around 100 papers and reviews in international scientific journals.

Key publications 
 Gan X, Wang J, Wang C, Sommer E, Kozasa T, Srinivasula S, Alessi D, Offermanns S, Simon MI, Wu D. (2012). PRR5L degradation promotes mTORC2-mediated PKC-δ phosphorylation and cell migration downstream of Gα (12). Nat. Cell Biol
 Li, P., Nijhawan, D., Budihardjo, I., Srinivasula, S. M., Ahmad, M., Alnemri, E. S., & Wang, X. (1997). Cytochrome c and dATP-Dependent Formation of Apaf-1/Caspase-9 Complex Initiates an Apoptotic Protease Cascade. Cell, 91(4), 479–489.
 Fujita K and Srinivasula SM. (2011). TLR4-mediated autophagy in macrophages is a p62-dependent type of selective autophagy of aggresome-like induced structures (ALIS). Autophagy, 7: 29–31.
 Fujita K, Xiao Q, Maeda D and Srinivasula SM. (2011). Nrf2-mediated induction of p62 controls TLR4-driven ALIS formation and autophagic degradation, Proc Nat Acad Sci, USA, 108: 1427–32.
 Shukla S, Fujita K, Xiao Q, and Srinivasula SM. (2011). A shear stress responsive gene product PP1201 protects against Fas-mediated apoptosis by reducing Fas expression on the cell surface. Apoptosis, 16: 162–173.
 Liao, W, Fujita K, Xiao Q, Tchikov V, Yang W, Gunsor, M, Garfield S, Goldsmith, P. El-Deiry WS, Schutze S, and Srinivasula SM. (2009). CARP1 Regulates Induction of NF-κB by TNF-a. Current Biology. 19: R17-R19
 Liao, W, Xiao Q, Tchikov V, Fujita K, Yang W, Wincovitch S, Garfield S, Schutze S, El-Deiry WS, and Srinivasula SM. (2008). CARP-2 is an endosome-associated ubiquitin ligase for RIP and regulates TNF-induced NF-?B activation. Current Biology (article). 18: 641–9.
 Srinivasula SM, Jones JM., Datta P., Ji W., Gupta S., Zhang Z., Davies E., Hajnóczky G., Saunders TL., Van Keuren ML., Alnemri T., Meisler ML and Alnemri ES. (2003). Loss of Omi/HtrA2 protease activity causes the neuromuscular disorder of mnd2 mutant mice. Nature. 425: 721–727.
 Srinivasula SM, Datta P, Kobayashi M, Wu J-W, Fujioka M, Hegde R, Zhang Z, Mukattash, Fernandes-Alnemri T, Shi Y, Jaynes JB, Alnemri ES. (2002). Sickle, a novel Drosophila death gene in the reaper/hid/grim region encodes an IAP-inhibitory protein. Curr Biol. 12: 125–30.
 Srinivasula SM, Hegde R, Saleh A, Datta P, Shiozaki E, Chai J, Lee RA., Robbins PD, Fernandes-Alnemri T, Shi Y., Alnemri ES. (2001). A conserved XIAP-interaction motif in caspase-9 and Smac/Diablo regulates caspase activity and apoptosis. Nature. 410: 112–16.
 Srinivasula SM, Saleh A, Balkir L, Robbins PD, and Alnemri ES. (2000). Negative regulation of the Apaf-1 apoptosome by Hsp70. Nature Cell Biol 2: 476–483.

Book chapters 
 Fujita, K and Srinivasula SM. (2009). Ubiquitination and Death-receptor signaling. Death Receptors and Cognate Ligands in Cancer. Results Probl Cell Differ, SpringerLinks Publisher. 49: 87-114.
 Srinivasula SM, Saleh A, Ahmad M, Fernandes-Alnemri T, Alnemri ES. (2001). Isolation and Assay of Caspases. Ch. 1. Methods in Cell Biol. 66:1-27.

External links 
Profile page at IISER Thiruvananthapuram
Faculty profile at IRINS

References 

Living people
Indian molecular biologists
20th-century Indian biologists
1963 births